Mastandrea is an Italian surname. Notable people with the surname include:

 Alicia Mastandrea, Argentine politician
 Katlin Mastandrea (born 1995), American actress 
 Valerio Mastandrea (born 1972), Italian actor

Italian-language surnames